Bishwanath Roy (1906-1984) was a freedom fighter and an Indian politician. He was born in a Bhumihar family. He was elected to the Lok Sabha, the lower house of the Parliament of India from the Deoria constituency of Uttar Pradesh as a member of the Indian National Congress. He was a student of St. Andrew's College, Gorakhpur and the University of Allahabad. He was the Deputy Minister of Labour, Employment and Rehabilitation in the Union government.

References

External links
Official biographical sketch in Parliament of India website

1906 births
1984 deaths
Indian National Congress politicians
Lok Sabha members from Uttar Pradesh
India MPs 1952–1957
India MPs 1957–1962
India MPs 1962–1967
India MPs 1967–1970
India MPs 1971–1977
People from Deoria district
People from Ballia district
Indian National Congress politicians from Uttar Pradesh